Monk Montgomery in Africa...Live! is the fourth and final solo album of American bassist Monk Montgomery. It was recorded at the Orlando Stadium, Soweto, South Africa, on November 9, 1974, and released in 1975 on Philadelphia International Records.

Background

In 1970 Montgomery recorded in Los Angeles with South African trumpeter Hugh Masekela, on Masekela’s album Reconstruction. In 1974 Monk toured South Africa with a group including singer Lovelace Watkins, and at the end of the tour he recorded this live album in Soweto.

Track listing
"Jumpin' at the Woodside" (Count Basie) (11:18)
"Stella by Starlight" (Victor Young) (6:00)
"Blues for Nkwe" (Al Hall, Jr.) (11:12)
"Testing One, Two" (Rudolph Johnson) (5:48)

Personnel
 Monk Montgomery - bass
 Marshall Royal - band leader, alto saxophone
 Rudolph Johnson - tenor saxophone, flute
 Danny Cortez - trumpet
 Al Hall, Jr. - trombone
 Delbert Hill - clarinet
 Charles Mallory - guitar
 Kirk Lightsey - keyboards
 Curtis Kirk - drums

Technical personnel
 Hilton Rosenthal, Peter Thwaites - producers
 Peter Thwaites - engineer (Gallo Studios)
 Peter Ceronio - assistant engineer (Gallo Studios)
 Rufus - cover design
 Ronnie Kwei - photographs
 Mobile recording unit supplied by Northwest Music

References

Monk Montgomery albums
1975 live albums
Philadelphia International Records live albums